Gustavo Julio Alfaro (born 14 August 1962) is an Argentine football manager and former player.

Although Alfaro had a short career as a footballer, he was captain of the Atlético de Rafaela, when they were promoted to the Argentine Primera División in 1989. Alfaro retired as a player from football in 1992 to concentrate on his coaching career. He his first league title came with Arsenal de Sarandí in the 2012 Clausura.

Coaching career

Alfaro started his career as manager working for Atlético de Rafaela and Patronato de Paraná in the early 1990s. He then had his first spell as manager of Quilmes and a second spell at Atlético de Rafaela.

In 2001, Alfaro became the manager of Olimpo and led them to the Primera B Nacional Apertura 2001 championship and promotion to the Primera.

In 2003, Alfaro led Quilmes to promotion. He stayed to manage the team for the following season (2003–04), achieving a 4th and a 6th-place finish which earned them qualification for the 2005 Copa Libertadores and 2004 Copa Sudamericana tournaments.

In his only shot at an important club, Alfaro had a disastrous spell in San Lorenzo, before joining Arsenal de Sarandí in late 2006.

Alfaro helped Arsenal to two 5th-place finishes, allowing the club to qualify for the Copa Libertadores for the first time in their history. They also earned qualification for the 2007 Copa Sudamericana, where they beat Argentine champions San Lorenzo in the qualifying round to earn a place in the round of 16. In that stage, they faced Brazilian team Goiás. Arsenal won 3–2 in Brazil and recorded a 1–1 draw in the second leg to win the tie 4–3 on aggregate, their official first victory over foreign opposition. Arsenal eventually reached the final of the competition, leaving a wake of sacked managers in their wake, including Daniel Passarella, who resigned from River Plate after their defeat by Arsenal in the semi-finals.

In the final of the competition, Arsenal drew 4–4 with Mexican América, winning the title on the Away goals rule. This was the first major championship in the history of Arsenal de Sarandí and also Alfaro's first major title.

In the end of the 2007–08, season he was replaced by Daniel Garnero as manager of Arsenal. In October 2008, he was named as the manager of Rosario Central. At 2009 he went to Saudi Arabia to work in Al-Ahli (Jeddah), he came with high expectations from the fans. he stayed as the coach for 4 months, then on 20 November he resigned for personal reasons.

On 17 May 2010 Arsenal de Sarandí confirmed that the new manager for next season would be Alfaro, who arrived along with assistant coaches Sergio Chiarelli, Carlos González and Claudio Cristofanelli. On 24 June 2012, Alfaro would achieve his first ever league title when Arsenal won its first league title in the club's history.

The Final Tournament of 2014 looked good for Alfaro. He had a very good team that was going to play at the Copa Libertadores. By April, the team was having awful results and he announced he would leave the club by the end of June. However, he was discharged by the club  and replaced by Martín Palermo.

On 2 January 2019 Boca Juniors named Gustavo Alfaro their new head coach, having his official debut on 27 January 2019, drawing 1–1 against Newell's Old Boys for the 2018–19 Super League. In the national competition he would finish third. On 2 May, he would be able to lift the 2018 Argentine Super Cup after playing against Rosario Central, winning in a penalty shootout by 6–5 after drawing 0–0 in the ninety minutes. On 2 June he would lose 0–2 against Club Tigre the final of the 2019 Super League Cup in Córdoba. Beyond the title obtained, the specialized press criticized Alfaro for the lack of a clear game identity in his team.

Coaching statistics

Honours
Olimpo
Primera B Nacional: 2001 Apertura

Arsenal
Primera División: 2012 Clausura
Copa Argentina: 2012–13
Copa Sudamericana: 2007

Boca Juniors
Supercopa Argentina: 2018

References

External Links

1962 births
Living people
People from Rafaela
Argentine footballers
Association football midfielders
Atlético de Rafaela footballers
Argentine football managers
Atlético de Rafaela managers
Club Atlético Patronato managers
Quilmes Atlético Club managers
Club Atlético Belgrano managers
Olimpo managers
San Lorenzo de Almagro managers
Rosario Central managers
Arsenal de Sarandí managers
Al-Ahli Saudi FC managers
Club de Gimnasia y Esgrima La Plata managers
Club Atlético Huracán managers
Boca Juniors managers
Ecuador national football team managers
2021 Copa América managers
Sportspeople from Santa Fe Province
2022 FIFA World Cup managers
Argentine expatriate football managers
Expatriate football managers in Saudi Arabia
Expatriate football managers in Ecuador
Argentine expatriate sportspeople in Saudi Arabia
Argentine expatriate sportspeople in Ecuador